Khaleqabad (also Romanized as Khāleqābād) is a village in Ravar Rural District, in the Central District of Ravar County, Kerman Province, Iran. At the 2006 census, its population was 295, in 74 families, which makes an average of 3.98 inhabitants per family.

References 

Populated places in Ravar County